Eupithecia vinaceata is a moth in the family Geometridae. It was described by David Stephen Fletcher in 1956. It is found in Kenya.

References

Moths described in 1956
vinaceata
Moths of Africa